20461 Dioretsa  is a centaur and damocloid on a retrograde, cometary-like orbit from the outer Solar System. It was discovered on 8 June 1999, by members of the LINEAR team at the Lincoln Laboratory Experimental Test Site near Socorro, New Mexico, United States. It was named Dioretsa, the word "asteroid" spelled backwards.

Classification and orbit 

Dioretsa is a member of the damocloids, with a retrograde orbit and a negative TJupiter of −1.547. It is also a centaur, as its orbit has a semi-major axis in between that of Jupiter (5.5 AU) Neptune (30.1 AU). The Minor Planet Center lists it as a critical object and (other) unusual minor planet due to an orbital eccentricity of more than 0.5.

It orbits the Sun at a distance of 2.4–45.4 AU once every 116 years and 10 months (42,686 days; semi-major axis of 23.9 AU). Its orbit has an eccentricity of 0.90 and an inclination of 160° with respect to the ecliptic. Its observation arc begins 12 months prior to its official discovery observation, with a precovery taken by Spacewatch at Steward Observatory in June 1998. , it was last observed in 2000 and its orbit still has an uncertainty of 2.

Retrograde orbit 

An inclination of greater than 90° means that a body moves in a retrograde orbit. Dioretsas orbit is otherwise similar to that of a comet. This has led to speculation that Dioretsa was originally an object from the Oort cloud.

Naming 

The minor planet's name "Dioretsa" is the word "asteroid" spelled backwards, and is the first numbered of currently 136 known (see Data Base Search of the Minor Planet Center) minor planets with a retrograde motion in the Solar System. The approved naming citation was published by the Minor Planet Center on 1 May 2003.

Physical characteristics 

According to observations made with the 10-meter Keck Telescope, Dioretsa measures 14 kilometers in diameter and its surface has a low albedo of 0.03. It has an absolute magnitude of 13.8. As of 2018, Dioretsas spectral type as well as its rotation period and shape remain unknown.

References

External links 
 20461 Dioretsa, Small Bodies Data Ferret
 Asteroid Lightcurve Database (LCDB), query form (info )
 Dictionary of Minor Planet Names, Google books
 Discovery Circumstances: Numbered Minor Planets (20001)-(25000) – Minor Planet Center
 
 

Centaurs (small Solar System bodies)
020461
020461
020461
Named minor planets
19990608
Minor planets with a retrograde orbit